The Statue of Yuri Gagarin in Greenwich, London, is a zinc statue depicting the cosmonaut wearing a spacesuit and standing on top of a globe.  The figure was originally unveiled on 14 July 2011 at a temporary location in the Mall, close to Admiralty Arch and facing the statue of Captain James Cook. It was later moved to the Royal Observatory, Greenwich, at a site overlooking the Prime Meridian line, and was unveiled at the new location on 7 March 2013. There had been an unsuccessful proposal to move it to Manchester.

The statue was a gift to the British Council from the Russian space agency Roscosmos as a part of several cultural events commemorating the 50th anniversary of the first human spaceflight. The original location of the statue was chosen to be where Gagarin first met the then Prime Minister Harold Macmillan.

See also
Monument to Yuri Gagarin – large statue in Moscow

References

External links
 

2011 sculptures
Outdoor sculptures in London
Gagarin, Yuri
Zinc sculptures
Buildings and structures in the Royal Borough of Greenwich
Monuments and memorials to Yuri Gagarin
2011 establishments in England
Monuments and memorials in London
Maps in art
Diplomatic gifts